Dorcadion kasikoporanum is a species of beetle in the family Cerambycidae. It was described by Pic in 1902.

References

kasikoporanum
Beetles described in 1902